Dick O'Bree is a former Australian rules footballer who played with Collingwood in the Victorian Football League (VFL).

Originally from Euroa Football Club, Collingwood had attempted to lure the Full-forward for years before O'Bree signed with them. After making his debut in the 1957 VFL season, O'Bree broke his leg in a match against Richmond at their home ground Punt Road Oval. As there were no stretchers available, O'Bree was carried from the ground on Richmond's training room door.

After recovering from his broken leg, O'Bree returned to play for Euroa, becoming a record goalkicker and premiership winning coach.

Notes

Sources
 Piesse, K. (2011) Great Australian Football Stories, The Five Mile Press: Melbourne. .
Dick O'Bree's profile	

1936 births
Living people
Australian rules footballers from Victoria (Australia)
Collingwood Football Club players
Euroa Football Club players